Tesheva Creek is a stream in the U.S. state of Mississippi.

Tesheva is a name derived from the Choctaw language purported to mean either "one who goes and washes" or "what is used to wash one with" (i.e. soap). Variant names are "Techevah Creek", "Techeyeh Creek", "Tesecah Creek", "Teshecah Creek", "Tesheeah Creek", "Tesheevah Creek", and "Teshevah Creek".

Popular Culture
In 2015, the "Southern Psychedelic" rock group Tesheva adopted the name.

References

Rivers of Mississippi
Rivers of Holmes County, Mississippi
Rivers of Yazoo County, Mississippi
Mississippi placenames of Native American origin